SciFiNow was a British magazine published every four weeks by Kelsey Media in the United Kingdom, covering the science fiction, horror and fantasy genres. It launched in April 2007, with the print publication ceasing in May 2020.

Following the print magazine's closure, SciFiNow transitioned to an online only media presence, publishing daily news, interviews, reviews and competitions covering films, TV shows, books and comics in the Science Fiction, Horror and Fantasy genres. In addition to the content on its own website, longer features and archival pieces from back issues are published under the brand-name "SciFiNow+" in the subscription-based website and app The Companion.

In 2010, SciFiNow won the Best Magazine award at the Fantasy Horror Award ceremony in Orvieto, Italy.

References

External links
 

2007 establishments in the United Kingdom
2020 disestablishments in England
2020 disestablishments in the United Kingdom
Magazines established in 2007
Magazines disestablished in 2020
Monthly magazines published in the United Kingdom
Science fiction magazines published in the United Kingdom
Science fiction-related magazines